Magnificent City is a full American studio album by American rapper Aceyalone, accompanied by American hip hop producer RJD2. It was released on Decon and Project Blowed in 2006. It peaked at number 39 on the Billboard Heatseekers Albums chart, as well as number 43 on the Independent Albums chart.

RJD2 released a compilation of instrumental versions of songs from the album in 2006, entitled Magnificent City Instrumentals. The track "A Beautiful Mine" was adapted as the opening theme of the AMC television series Mad Men.

Critical reception

At Metacritic, which assigns a weighted average score out of 100 to reviews from mainstream critics, the album received an average score of 81, based on 10 reviews, indicating "universal acclaim".

John Bush of AllMusic gave the album 4.5 stars out of 5, saying: "Ten years after West Coast rap began to slow down, Rjd2 shows he can interpret it for the 21st century, with huge hooks that draw listeners in, but clever productions that allow for all of Aceyalone's talents to shine through." Nathan Rabin of The A.V. Club gave the album a grade of A−, saying: "Aceyalone hasn't felt this vital in ages, and RJD2's creative winning streak continues unabated."

Jonathan Keefe of Slant Magazine named it the 9th best album of 2006.

Track listing

Charts

References

External links
 

2006 albums
Collaborative albums
Aceyalone albums
RJD2 albums
Decon albums
Project Blowed